Blues Allnight is an album by American guitarist James Blood Ulmer recorded in 1989 and released on the In + Out label.

Reception
Allmusic awarded the album 3 stars.

Track listing
All compositions by James Blood Ulmer
 "Blues Allnight" - 5:09  
 "Calling Marry" - 5:33  
 "Peace and Happiness" - 4:08  
 "She Ain't So Cold" - 4:19  
 "Changing Times" - 4:08  
 "Baby Snatcher" - 4:32  
 "Boss Machine" - 4:09  
 "I Don't Know Why" - 5:22

Personnel
James Blood Ulmer - guitar, vocals
Winnie Leyh - keyboards, backing vocals 
Amin Ali - bass, backing vocals
Ronnie Drayton - guitar, backing vocals
Grant Calvin Weston - drums, backing vocals

References

James Blood Ulmer albums
1989 albums